Rev I the Just was a king of Iberia (natively known as Kartli, i.e., eastern Georgia) from 189 to 216. His reign inaugurated the local Arsacid dynasty.

The name "Rev" derives from Middle Iranian Rēw, itself from the Avestan adjective raēva, meaning "rich, splendid, opulent".

He is known exclusively from the medieval Georgian annals which make him a son of the king of Armenia, whom the historians Cyril Toumanoff and Stephen H. Rapp identifies with the Arsacid, Vologases II. Rev was enthroned by the rebellious Iberian nobles who deposed his maternal uncle, Amazasp II, last of the Pharnabazids. Rev is reported to have married a "Greek" princess Sephelia who is said to have brought an idol of Aphrodite to Iberia, but there is no indication of a local cult of this Greek goddess having ever existing.

The Georgian chronicle Life of the Kings says that Rev, albeit pagan, was sympathetic to the doctrines of Christianity and came to be known as martali, or "the Just" for his patronage of a local embryonic Christian community. Toumanoff illustrated that this sobriquet is a direct translation of dikaios, an epithet frequently used in the titulature of the Arsacid kings of Parthia.

References

Sources
 
 
 
  

216 deaths
Arsacid dynasty of Iberia
3rd-century monarchs in Asia
2nd-century monarchs in Asia
2nd-century Iranian people
3rd-century Iranian people
Year of birth unknown